Angelo Uggeri (1754 - 1837) was an Italian abbot, graphic artist, and antiquarian. 

He was born in Lombardy. He studied art and architecture at Cremona; but joined the ecclesiastical profession. from 1788 worked in Rome. In 1823, Pope Leo XII named him as secretary to the commission planning reconstruction of the Basilica of Saint Paul Outside the Walls. In 1800 while in Rome, he published Giornate pittoreschi degli edifici antichi di Roma e dei contorni.

References

1754 births
1837 deaths
Italian antiquarians
19th-century Italian writers